The Departmental Council of Pyrénées-Atlantiques is the deliberative assembly of the Pyrénées-Atlantiques department in the region of Nouvelle-Aquitaine. It consists of 54 members (general councilors) from 27 cantons. Until the 2015 French departmental elections, it was known as  the General Council.

Vice-Presidents 
The President of the Departmental Council is assisted by 12 vice-presidents chosen from among the departmental advisers. Each of them has a delegation of authority.

References

See also 

 Pyrénées-Atlantiques
 Departmental council (France)
 Departmental Council of Pyrénées-Atlantiques (official website)

Pyrénées-Atlantiques
Pyrénées-Atlantiques